Robert Klaasen (born 6 September 1993) is a Dutch professional footballer who plays as a midfielder for Eerste Divisie club VVV-Venlo. He most notably played for Kortrijk, De Graafschap and Roda JC.

Career

Early years
Klaasen started his football career at the age of six at Zeeburgia. He left the club after a year for Ajax's youth academy. After playing in Amsterdam for five years, he moved to the youth academy of HFC Haarlem. There he played one year in the academy before moving to Feyenoord in 2006.

He then joined AZ from Feyenoord's youth academy in 2007, and signed a two-year senior contract with the club on 19 May 2011. Coming through the AZ academy, Klaasen described himself as a "holding midfielder, with a good shot and vision. I can be compared to Stijn Schaars." Ahead of the 2012–13 season, some of the club's talents, including Klaasen, were given the chance to join the first team's pre-season friendlies. He would, however, play the season with the youth team. At the end of the season, Klaasen's contract was terminated.

Kortrijk
Prior to the start of the 2013–14 season, Klaassen trialled with Kortrijk. He tested for around four weeks before it was announced that he became part of the team, signing a three-year contract on 20 July 2013. Klaasen made his professional debut on 27 July 2013, replacing Gertjan De Mets in the 78th minute of a 1–0 home win over OH Leuven. On 7 December 2013, four months after his last appearance, he scored his first goal in professional football, the 1–1 equalizer in the 87th minute against Sporting Charleroi. He made his first start on 22 February 2014, playing the full ninety minutes against Mons.

Sparta Rotterdam
On 8 January 2016, Klaasen moved to Sparta Rotterdam, where he signed a contract until the end of the season with an option to extend for two seasons. He made his debut for the club ten days later, on 18 January, replacing Ryan Sanusi in the 83rd minute of a 5–2 victory over RKC Waalwijk in the Eerste Divisie. His first start came in the 2–1 league win at FC Den Bosch on 31 January. On 12 February, Klaasen scored his first goal for Sparta in a 3–0 away win over Achilles '29. Sparta picked up the option in Klaasen's contract on 22 February, extending his contract until 2018.

Klaasen made five appearances for Sparta that, scoring once, as the club won the Eerste Divisie and reached promotion to the Eredivisie.

De Graafschap
On 26 January 2017, Klaasen was sent on a six-month loan until the end of the season to De Graafschap, competing in the Eerste Divisie. He made his debut for the club as a starter in a 3–2 league loss to Jong FC Utrecht on 30 January 2017. He signed a permanent deal with the club on 2 May 2017, a one-year contract with an option for an additional season.

On 11 May 2018, Klaasen extended his contract with De Graafschap until 2019. Upon signing, technical director Peter Hofstede stated: "Robert has made strides this season. We think he can grow further and want to give him that chance here."

Roda JC
On 7 July 2019, Klaasen joined Eerste Divisie club Roda JC on a two-year contract. He made his debut for the club on the first matchday of the season as a starter in the 1–1 home draw against Almere City.

Klaasen scored his first goal for Roda JC on 5 December 2020, opening the score from a free kick in a 1–1 draw away against Jong PSV.

VVV-Venlo
Klaasen moved to VVV-Venlo on 10 June 2022, signing a two-year contract. His club debut came on the first matchday of the 2022–23 season in a 3–0 home win over Almere City. On 11 December, he scored his first goal for the club, helping the club to a 2–1 victory against provincial rivals MVV Maastricht.

Personal life

Career statistics

Honours
Sparta Rotterdam
 Eerste Divisie: 2015–16

References

External links
 
 

Living people
1993 births
Association football midfielders
Dutch footballers
Netherlands youth international footballers
Dutch expatriate footballers
K.V. Kortrijk players
Sparta Rotterdam players
De Graafschap players
Roda JC Kerkrade players
VVV-Venlo players
Belgian Pro League players
Eredivisie players
Eerste Divisie players
Tweede Divisie players
Footballers from Amsterdam
Dutch expatriate sportspeople in Belgium
Expatriate footballers in Belgium